The 1968–69 British Home Championship was the third edition of the tournament to be held while England were World Champions following their victory in the 1966 FIFA World Cup. The tournament was reverted to its pre-First World War format, being played at the end of the season in a short period of time, to relax the demands on the players during the competitive season. England re-emphasised their dominance over the British game with a second comfortable win in a row. The tournament began with the favourites England and Scotland securing comfortable (if dramatic) wins over their weaker opponents, before England repeated the feat in a tougher game against Wales and Scotland were held to a draw by Ireland. Going into the final game needing a win, the Scots were thoroughly beaten by a strong English team, who took the trophy in a 4–1 victory.

Table

Results

References

External links
Full Results and Line-ups

1969
1969 in British sport
1968–69 in Northern Ireland association football
1968–69 in English football
1968–69 in Welsh football
1968–69 in Scottish football